Ulysses S. Grant (born Hiram Ulysses Grant; April 27, 1822 – July 23, 1885) was the 18th president of the United States (1869–1877) following his success as military commander in the American Civil War. Under Grant, the Union Army defeated the Confederate military and secession, the war ending with the surrender of Robert E. Lee's army at Appomattox Court House. As president, Grant led the Radical Republicans in their effort to eliminate vestiges of Confederate nationalism and slavery, protect African American citizenship, and pursued Reconstruction in the former Confederate states. In foreign policy, Grant sought to increase American trade and influence, while remaining at peace with the world. Although his Republican Party split in 1872 as reformers denounced him, Grant was easily reelected. During his second term the country's economy was devastated by the Panic of 1873, while investigations exposed corruption scandals in the administration. Although still below average, his reputation among scholars has significantly improved in recent years because of greater appreciation for his commitment to civil rights, moral courage in his prosecution of the Ku Klux Klan, and enforcement of voting rights.

 In May 2012, on the 50th anniversary of the founding of the Ulysses S. Grant Foundation, Mississippi State University was selected as the permanent location for Ulysses S. Grant's Presidential Library.  Historian John Y. Simon edited Grant's letters into a 32-volume scholarly edition published by Southern Illinois University Press.

For a comprehensive scholarly annotated bibliography covering several thousand books, articles, and archival sources see Marie Ellen Kelsey, ed. Ulysses S. Grant: A Bibliography: A Bibliography (2005).  online

Biographical and political

 

 
 
 
 
 
  
  
 

 scholarly review and response by Calhoun at DOI: 10.14296/RiH/2014/2270 
 {eBook}
 
 (e'Book)    
  (e'Book)

 
  
 
 
 

  
 

 
  

 
 
 
 
 
 

 

 
 
 
 
 
 

 

 
 

 

  
  
 
 
 
  
 
 ; Pulitzer Prize

 
 

 
 
 

 

 
  ( (Alternative eBook)
 (reprint edition, June 1, 1967, by Johnson Reprint Corp)
 
 

 
 
 
 
 
 
 
 
  

  
 
  

 

 

 
 

 
 Woodward, William E. (1931). Meet General Grant, Garden Publishing Company, (Original from University of Virginia Press), 524 pages

Military
 
 
 
 , Google eBook

 
 
 
 
 
 
 

 
 
 
 
 Dorsett, Lyle W. "The Problem of Ulysses S. Grant’s Drinking During the Civil War," Hayes Historical Journal vol. 4, no.2 (1983): 37–49.  online

 

 
 
 
 
 
 

 
 
 Kantor, MacKinlay, 2007. Lee and Grant at Appomattox, Sterling Publishing Company, 

 
 

 
 
 

 
 
 
 
 
 
 
 
 
 ; received negative reviews

 Nevins, Allan. The War for the Union (4 vol 1959–71), comprehensive coverage of all aspects of the war.
 
 
 
 

 

 
 Silkenat, David. Raising the White Flag: How Surrender Defined the American Civil War. Chapel Hill: University of North Carolina Press, 2019. .

Grant's memoirs, two volume work

(Many editions in paper and online; ends in 1865)

Two volume work
 Personal memoirs of U.S. Grant, Vol I,  C.L.Webster, 1885
 Personal memoirs of U.S. Grant, Vol II,  C.L.Webster, 1885

Other formats

 ; 
 ; 
 ; 
 ; 
 ; 
 ;
        
 ;

Early biographers  (and memoirs of close associates)

Primary sources

Inaugural Addresses
1869 Inaugural Address – Ulysses S. Grant
1873 Inaugural Address – Ulysses S. Grant

State of the Union Addresses
1869 State of the Union Message – Ulysses S. Grant
1870 State of the Union Message – Ulysses S. Grant
1871 State of the Union Message – Ulysses S. Grant
1872 State of the Union Message – Ulysses S. Grant
1873 State of the Union Message – Ulysses S. Grant
1874 State of the Union Message – Ulysses S. Grant
1875 State of the Union Message – Ulysses S. Grant
1876 State of the Union Message – Ulysses S. Grant

Executive orders
Executive Orders 1869 - Ulysses S. Grant
Executive Orders 1870 - Ulysses S. Grant
Executive Orders 1871 - Ulysses S. Grant
Executive Orders 1872 - Ulysses S. Grant
Executive Orders 1873 - Ulysses S. Grant
Executive Orders 1874 - Ulysses S. Grant
Executive Orders 1875 - Ulysses S. Grant
Executive Orders 1876 - Ulysses S. Grant

Proclamations
 Proclamations 1869 - Ulysses S. Grant
 Proclamations 1870 - Ulysses S. Grant
 Proclamations 1871 - Ulysses S. Grant
 Proclamations 1872 - Ulysses S. Grant
 Proclamations 1873 - Ulysses S. Grant
 Proclamations 1874 - Ulysses S. Grant
 Proclamations 1875 - Ulysses S. Grant
 Proclamations 1876 - Ulysses S. Grant
 Proclamations 1877 - Ulysses S. Grant

Special Messages
 The American Presidency Project Document Archive Option 1: Search
1. President Ulysses S. Grant
2. Dates: March 4, 1869 to March 3, 1877
3. Document Category: Written Messages - To Congress

Civil Service Commission
 Ulysses S. Grant Executive Order April 16, 1872

Civil Rights Act of 1875
 An act to protect all citizens in their civil and legal rights. Library of Congress Statutes at Large 43rd Congress, 2nd Session, Volume 18, Part 3 pages 335-337

Veto Messages
The American Presidency Project Document Archive Option 1: Search
1. President Ulysses S. Grant
2. Dates: March 4, 1869, to March 3, 1877
3. Document Category: Veto Messages - To Congress

Treaty of Washington 1871
Treaty of Washington 1871 from Archive.org

Indian Appropriations Act 1871
 An Act making Appropriations for the current and contingent Expenses of the Indian Department, and for fulfilling Treaty Stipulations with Various Indian Tribes, for the Year ending June 30, eighteen hundred and seventy-two, and for other Purposes March 3, 1871

Papers of Ulysses S. Grant
 

 
 

Military accounts
 ; many editions in paper and online; ends in 1865
  
 

Grant's world tour

Historiography

 
 
 

 
 

 
 

 
 
 
 
 
 
  for commentary

List of articles for Ulysses S. Grant

 Ulysses S. Grant
 Early life and career of Ulysses S. Grant
 Ulysses S. Grant and the American Civil War
 Ulysses S. Grant as commanding general, 1865–1869
 Presidency of Ulysses S. Grant
 1868 United States presidential election
 1872 United States presidential election
 1876 United States presidential election
 Black Friday (1869)
 Ulysses S. Grant presidential administration scandals
 Ulysses S. Grant presidential administration reforms
 General Order No. 11 (1862)
 Post-presidency of Ulysses S. Grant
 World tour of Ulysses S. Grant
 Historical reputation of Ulysses S. Grant
 Ulysses S. Grant cultural depictions
 Personal Memoirs of Ulysses S. Grant
 Grant's Farm
 Gallery of images of Ulysses S. Grant
 Grant's Overland Campaign
 Grant's Tomb
 Template:Cabinet of President Ulysses S. Grant

See also

 Bibliography of the American Civil War
 Bibliography of the Reconstruction Era
 Bibliography of Abraham Lincoln
 Jesse Root Grant (father of Ulysses S. Grant)
 Jesse Root Grant (politician) (son of Ulysses S. Grant)
 Reconstruction Era

References

External links

Bibliography
Bibliographies of presidents of the United States
Bibliographies of people
Works about presidents of the United States
 Bibliography